Theodor Evertz (fl. c. 1554) was a Franco-Flemish composer from the Renaissance.

Life and work
Little is known about Evertz.

Three of his Dutch songs are preserved in the anthology of Dutch songs, published by Jacob Bathen in Maastricht in 1554:

 (O Venus, tormentor, have pity on me)
 (Awake, who ever you are)
 (My beloved, it cries to heaven)

No complete set of parts of Jacob Bathen's anthology has yet been retrieved (the soprano voice is missing), but one of the songs for four voices has been published in Petrus Phalesius’s  in 1572, of which at least one complete copy has survived.

Sources
The New Grove Dictionary of Music and Musicians, London, 2001
 Jan Willem Bonda, De meerstemmige Nederlandse liederen van de vijftiende en zestiende eeuw. Hilversum, Verloren, 1996. 

Flemish composers
Belgian male classical composers
Dutch composers
Renaissance composers
16th-century Franco-Flemish composers
Year of death unknown
Year of birth unknown